Nationality words link to articles with information on the nation's poetry or literature (for instance, Irish or France).

Events
May 23 – English poet Tony Walsh reads his 2013 poem "This is the place" to the crowds gathered in Albert Square, Manchester for a public vigil following this week's Manchester Arena bombing.
June 23 – English-resident writer Ben Okri publishes his poem "Grenfell Tower, June 2017" in the Financial Times following this month's Grenfell Tower fire in London.

Anniversaries
March 1 – Centenary of the birth of the American poet Robert Lowell.

Selection of works published in English

Australia
 Michael Farrell, I Love Poetry
 Alan Wearne, These Things Are Real
 Fiona Wright, Domestic Interior

Canada
Billy-Ray Belcourt, This Wound Is a World
Lorna Crozier, What the Soul Doesn't Want
Nora Gould, Selah
Aisha Sasha John, I have to live
Benjamin Hertwig, Slow War
Donato Mancini, Same Diff
Julia McCarthy, All the Names Between
Joshua Whitehead, Full-Metal Indigiqueer

Anthologies in Canada

New Zealand
 Airini Beautrais, Flow: Whanganui River Poems, Victoria University Press
 Kate Camp, The Internet of Things, Victoria University Press
 Paula Green, New York Pocket Book, Seraph Press

Poets in Best New Zealand Poems
These poets wrote the 25 poems selected for Best New Zealand Poems 2016 (guest editor was Jenny Bornholdt), published this year:

 Nick Ascroft
 Tusiata Avia 
 Airini Beautrais
 Hera Lindsay Bird
 James Brown

 Rachel Bush
 John Dennison
 Ish Doney 
 Lynley Edmeades
 Rata Gordon

 Bernadette Hall 
 Scott Hamilton
 Adrienne Jansen
 Andrew Johnston
 Anna Livesey

 Bill Manhire
 Leslie McKay
 Bill Nelson
 Claire Orchard
 Vincent O’Sullivan

 Kerrin P. Sharpe
 Marty Smith
 Oscar Upperton
 Tim Upperton
 Ashleigh Young

United Kingdom

England
 Megan Beech, You Sad Feminist
 Emily Berry, Stranger, Baby
 Kayo Chingonyi, Kumukanda
 Helen Dunmore (d. June 5), Inside the Wave
 Michael Longley, Angel Hill (Northern Irish poet published in England)
 Robert Macfarlane, The Lost Words: A Spell Book (illustrated by Jackie Morris)
 Hollie McNish, Plum
 Sinéad Morrissey, On Balance (Northern Irish poet published in England)
 Richard Osmond, Useful Verses

Northern Ireland

Scotland

Anthologies in the United Kingdom

Criticism, scholarship and biography in the United Kingdom

United States
Alphabetical listing by author name
Clark Coolidge, Selected Poems: 1962-1985, Station Hill Press
Shara McCallum, Madwoman, Alice James Books
Morgan Parker, There are More Beautiful Things than Beyoncé, Tin House Books

Anthologies in the United States

Criticism, scholarship and biography in the United States

Poets in The Best American Poetry 2017

Awards and honors by country
See also: List of poetry awards
Awards announced this year:

International
 Struga Poetry Evenings Golden Wreath Laureate:

Australia awards and honors
 C. J. Dennis Prize for Poetry:
 Kenneth Slessor Prize for Poetry:

Canada awards and honors
 Archibald Lampman Award: Stephen Brockwell, All of Us Reticent, Here, Together
 Atlantic Poetry Prize: Jennifer Houle, The Back Channels
 2017 Governor General's Awards: Richard Harrison, On Not Losing My Father's Ashes in the Flood (English), Louise Dupré, La Main hantée (French)
 Griffin Poetry Prize:
Canada: Jordan Abel, Injun
International: Alice Oswald, Falling Awake
Lifetime Recognition Award (presented by the Griffin trustees): Frank Bidart
 Latner Writers' Trust Poetry Prize: Louise Bernice Halfe
 Gerald Lampert Award: Ingrid Ruthig, This Being
 Pat Lowther Award: Sue Sinclair, Heaven's Thieves
 Prix Alain-Grandbois: Marie-Célie Agnant, Femmes des terres brûlées
 Raymond Souster Award: Louise Bernice Halfe, Burning in this Midnight Dream
 Dorothy Livesay Poetry Prize: Adèle Barclay, If I Were in a Cage I’d Reach Out for You
 Prix Émile-Nelligan: François Guerrette, Constellation des grands brûlés

France awards and honors
Prix Goncourt de la Poésie:

New Zealand awards and honors
 Prime Minister's Awards for Literary Achievement:
 Fiction: Witi Tame Ihimaera-Smiler
 Nonfiction: Peter Simpson
 Poetry: Paula Green
 Montana New Zealand Book Awards (poetry category):

United Kingdom awards and honors
 Cholmondeley Award: Caroline Bergvall, Sasha Dugdale, Philip Gross, Paula Meehan
 Costa Award (formerly "Whitbread Awards") for poetry:
 Shortlist: Kayo Chingonyi, Kumukanda; Helen Dunmore (d. June 5), Inside the Wave (also overall Book of the Year winner); Sinéad Morrissey, On Balance; Richard Osmond, Useful Verses
 English Association's Fellows' Poetry Prizes:
 Eric Gregory Award (for a collection of poems by a poet under the age of 30):
 Forward Poetry Prize:
Best Collection: 
Shortlist: 
Best First Collection:
Shortlist: 
Best Poem:
Shortlist:
 Jerwood Aldeburgh First Collection Prize for poetry:
Shortlist:
 Manchester Poetry Prize:
 National Poet of Wales:
 National Poetry Competition 2017:
 Queen's Gold Medal for Poetry: Paul Muldoon
 T. S. Eliot Prize (United Kingdom and Ireland):
Shortlist (announced in November 2017): 2017 Short List
 The Times / Stephen Spender Prize for Poetry Translation:

United States awards and honors
 Arab American Book Award (The George Ellenbogen Poetry Award):
Honorable Mentions: 
 Agnes Lynch Starrett Poetry Prize:
 Anisfield-Wolf Book Award: 
 Best Translated Book Award (BTBA):
 Beatrice Hawley Award from Alice James Books:
 Bollingen Prize: to Jean Valentine
 Jackson Poetry Prize:  to Patricia Spears Jones
Judges: Henri Cole, Kwame Dawes, and Mary Szybist
 Lambda Literary Award:
 Gay Poetry: 
 Lesbian Poetry: 
 Lenore Marshall Poetry Prize:
 Los Angeles Times Book Prize: 
Finalists: 
 National Book Award for Poetry (NBA):
NBA Finalists:
NBA Longlist: 
NBA Judges: 
 National Book Critics Circle Award for Poetry: 
 The New Criterion Poetry Prize: 
 Pulitzer Prize for Poetry (United States): to Tyehimba Jess for Olio
Finalists: XX by Campbell McGrath; Collected Poems: 1950-2012, by Adrienne Rich
 Wallace Stevens Award: 
 Whiting Awards: 
 PEN Award for Poetry in Translation: 
 PEN Center USA 2017 Poetry Award: 
 PEN/Voelcker Award for Poetry:                     
 Raiziss/de Palchi Translation Award:
 Ruth Lilly Poetry Prize: 
 Kingsley Tufts Poetry Award: 
 Walt Whitman Prize –         – Judge: 
 Yale Younger Series:

From the Poetry Society of America
 Frost Medal: to Susan Howe
 Shelley Memorial Award: to Gillian Conoley
 Writer Magazine/Emily Dickinson Award:
 Lyric Poetry Award:
 Alice Fay Di Castagnola Award:
 Louise Louis/Emily F. Bourne Student Poetry Award: 
 George Bogin Memorial Award: 
 Robert H. Winner Memorial Award: 
 Cecil Hemley Memorial Award:
 Norma Farber First Book Award:
 Lucille Medwick Memorial Award: 
 William Carlos Williams Award:        
Finalists for WCW Award:

Conferences and workshops by country

Australia

Canada

Mexico

New Zealand

United Kingdom

United States

Deaths

January – June
Birth years link to the corresponding "[year] in poetry" article:

January 2 – John Berger, 90, English novelist, painter and art critic, and poet (b. 1926)
January 25 – Harry Mathews, 86, American novelist and poet (b. 1930)
February 5 – Thomas Lux, 70, American poet and teacher (b. 1946)
February 8 – Tom Raworth, 78, British poet, visual artist, publisher, and teacher (b. 1938)
March 10 – Mari Evans, 93, American poet. (b. 1923)
March 16 – Wojciech Młynarski, 75, Polish poet, singer and songwriter (born 1941)
March 17 – Derek Walcott, 87, Saint Lucian poet and playwright, Nobel Laureate in 1992 (b. 1930)
March 22 – Joanne Kyger, 82, American poet who had ties to the poets of Black Mountain, the San Francisco Renaissance, and the Beat generation, (b. 1934)
April 1 – Yevgeny Yevtushenko, Russian poet, 84 (b. 1933)
May 24 – Denis Johnson, American poet (The Incognito Lounge), novelist (Tree of Smoke), and short story writer (Jesus' Son), 67 (b. 1947).
June 5 – Helen Dunmore, English poet, novelist and children's writer, 64 (born 1952)
June 8 - Shinichiro Hagihara, Japanese tanka poet

July – December
 November 15 – Michelle Boisseau, 62, American poet (b. 1955)

See also

 Poetry
 List of years in poetry
 List of poetry awards

References

External links

2010s in poetry
2017 poems
 
2017-related lists